Baengnyeon Temple (백련사) is a Buddhist temple located in Doam-myeon, Gangjin county, South Jeolla province, South Korea.

Its name means "White Lotus" temple, and its physical form dates to the late Joseon Dynasty.  Some records date the idea of a White Lotus temple to the 8th century.  It was designated a Local Tangible Cultural Property in 1986.

See also
Mandeoksan (South Jeolla)

External links
From Gangjin County Tourism website, in English

Gangjin County
Buddhist temples in South Korea
Buddhist temples of the Jogye Order
Buildings and structures in South Jeolla Province